Raquel Diaz Caro (born May 13, 1974 in Barcelona) is a track and field athlete from Spain. She has a disability: She is blind and a T11/B1 type athlete.  She competed at the 1996 Summer Paralympics, winning a bronze medal in the 100 meter T11 race and finishing fourth in 200 meter T11 race. She also competed at the 2000 Summer Paralympics.

References 

Living people
1974 births
Athletes from Barcelona
Visually impaired sprinters
Paralympic sprinters
Spanish disability athletes
Sportswomen with disabilities
Spanish female sprinters
Paralympic athletes of Spain
Paralympic bronze medalists for Spain
Athletes (track and field) at the 1992 Summer Paralympics
Athletes (track and field) at the 1996 Summer Paralympics
Athletes (track and field) at the 2000 Summer Paralympics
Paralympic medalists in athletics (track and field)
Medalists at the 1996 Summer Paralympics